Gramegna may refer to:
 (1898–1986), Italian communist politician
 (1846–1928), Italian writer and historian
Maria Gramegna (1887–1915), Italian mathematician
Pierre Gramegna (born 1958), Luxembourgish diplomat and politician
37840 Gramegna, minor planet named after Maria Gramegna